Coupe Green or Coup Green is a village in Lancashire, England. It is located on the A675 between Higher Walton and Hoghton. The village is in the borough of South Ribble and the Ribble Valley parliamentary constituency. The village has a primary school which opened in 1975, one pub and a few shops including a hairdresser and a Texaco petrol station.

The village is situated in the Hoghton postal district as Royal Mail does not recognise it as a separate village, this postal district also includes Gregson Lane and Hoghton is often called the village of two halves by residents. Despite this, it is administratively and geographically separate. The village is in the Coupe Green & Gregson Lane ward which elects two councillors, At the May 2011 election, two councillors were elected from the Conservative party Warren Bennett and Jim Marsh.

References

Villages in Lancashire
Geography of South Ribble